The Green Man is a three-part BBC TV adaptation OF Kingsley Amis's 1969 novel novel of the same name, first broadcast on BBC1 from 28 October to 11 November 1990 and starring Albert Finney as the main character Maurice.

Plot
Maurice Allington is the owner of "The Green Man", a country inn that he claims is haunted by ghosts. He is usually either frightening guests with his ghost stories, or trying to seduce them, but he slowly comes to realise that some of his stories may be true.

Cast
 Albert Finney as Maurice
 Linda Marlowe as Joyce
 Sarah Berger as Diana
 Nicky Henson as Jack
 Josie Lawrence as Lucy
 Michael Grandage as Nick
 Natalie Morse as Amy
 Michael Culver as Underhill
 Robert Schofield as David
 Michael Hordern as Gramps
 Nickolas Grace as Sonnenscheim
 Sandra Caron as Mrs. Klinger
 Brian Greene as Mr. Klinger
 Anna Syke as Mrs. Underhill

Production

Locations
The serial was filmed on location with West Dorset doubling as the Cambridgeshire area and Up Cerne Manor House (and possibly Dominey's Yard by Buckland Newton) representing The Green Man hotel and other exteriors.

Reception

Awards
The series won the 1991 BAFTA for Best Original Television Music (by Tim Souster), Finney was nominated for Best Actor, and Masahiro Hirakubo was nominated for Best Film Editor.

References

External links
 
 

1990 British television series debuts
1990 British television series endings
1990s British drama television series
BBC television dramas
1990s British television miniseries
Television shows based on British novels
British supernatural television shows
English-language television shows
Television shows set in Dorset
Television shows set in Cambridgeshire
Films based on works by Kingsley Amis
British ghost films
British haunted house films